William P. Morton  was a professional baseball player who played pitcher in the Major Leagues in two games for the 1884 Philadelphia Quakers. He later played in the minors in 1885 and 1886.

External links

Major League Baseball pitchers
Philadelphia Quakers players
19th-century baseball players
Wilmington Blue Hens players
Atlantic City (minor league baseball) players
Bridgeport Giants players
Year of death missing
Year of birth missing
Baseball players from Philadelphia